Bernard Peter Atha  (27 August 1928 – 22 October 2022) was an English politician and actor. He served as Lord Mayor of Leeds and was a major figure in the arts and sport in West Yorkshire and elsewhere; he also appeared in a number of films.

Life and career
Atha was born in Leeds on 27 August 1928, and educated at Leeds Modern School, now Lawnswood School, and the University of Leeds.

In Ken Loach's film Kes (1969) Atha played the part of the careers officer who "throws Billy on the scrap heap". He also had small roles in the Ken Loach films Family Life (1971) and Black Jack (1979). Atha's television credits include roles in the series All Creatures Great and Small, Sherlock Holmes, Coronation Street, Emmerdale and Last of the Summer Wine.

Atha served as Lord Mayor of Leeds from 2000 to 2001. During his mayoralty he selected 18 "high-profile, well-known Yorkshire women" to act in turn as his Lady Mayoress, a role traditionally taken by the spouse or another family member of the mayor.

Atha was appointed Commander of the Order of the British Empire (CBE) in the 2007 Birthday Honours "for services to the Arts and to the community in Leeds", having earlier been appointed Officer of the Order of the British Empire (OBE) in the 1991 New Year Honours "for services to Sport, particularly Sport for the Disabled". He died on 22 October 2022, at the age of 94.

References

External links

1928 births
2022 deaths
Alumni of the University of Leeds
Commanders of the Order of the British Empire
English male film actors
Labour Party (UK) councillors
Councillors in Leeds
Lord Mayors of Leeds
People educated at Leeds Modern School